David Warnke (born December 30, 1960) is a former professional American football player who was a placekicker for one season for the Tampa Bay Buccaneers. He is one of only four NFL players to score exactly one point for the Buccaneers.

References

1960 births
Living people
Augsburg Auggies football players
American football placekickers
Tampa Bay Buccaneers players